A randkluft (from the German for marginal cleft/crevasse) or rimaye (from the same French ) is the headwall gap between a glacier or snowfield and the adjacent rock face at the back of the cirque or, more loosely, between the rock face and the side of the glacier.

In French, the word rimaye covers both notions of randkluft and bergschrund.

Formation 
It is formed by the melting of ice against warmer rock and may be very deep. During summer therefore, a randkluft will become wider and thus more difficult for climbers to negotiate. Randklufts are often found in relatively low-lying glaciers such as the Blaueis in the Berchtesgaden Alps or the Höllentalferner in the Wetterstein.

A randkluft is similar to, but not identical with, a bergschrund, which is the place on a high-altitude glacier where the moving ice stream breaks away from the static ice frozen to the rock creating a large crevasse. Unlike a randkluft, a bergschrund has two ice walls.

Gallery

See also 
 Crevasse
 The French Wikipedia entry for Rimaye which states that the rimaye is either between the rock and the glacier, or between the fixed part of the ice and the moving part.

References

External links 
 Cryosphere Glossary, National Snow and Ice Data Center
 Photo of the randkluft on the Höllentalferner

Glaciology
Mountaineering